Russian Blood is the first studio album by the space rock trio Ribs. It was released on May 29, 2012, by Arbitrary Music Group.

Track listing

References

2012 albums
Ribs (band) albums